The 2017 Minnesota Golden Gophers football team represented the University of Minnesota during the 2017 NCAA Division I FBS football season. The Gophers were led by first-year head coach P. J. Fleck and played their home games at TCF Bank Stadium in Minneapolis, Minnesota. Minnesota competed as a member of the West Division of the Big Ten Conference. They finished the season 5–7, 2–7 in Big Ten play to finish in sixth place in the West Division.

Recruiting

Position key

Recruits

The Gophers signed a total of 26 recruits.

Schedule
The Gophers' 2017 schedule consisted of 7 home games and 5 away games. Minnesota hosted two of its non-conference games; against Buffalo from the MAC and against Middle Tennessee from Conference USA; the Gophers played on the road against Oregon State from the Pac-12.

The Gophers played nine conference games; they hosted Maryland, Michigan State, Illinois, Nebraska, and Wisconsin. They traveled to Purdue, Iowa, and Michigan, and Northwestern.

Sources:

Game summaries

Buffalo

at Oregon State

Middle Tennessee

Maryland

at Purdue

Michigan State

Illinois

at Iowa

at Michigan

Nebraska

at Northwestern

Wisconsin

Roster

References

Minnesota
Minnesota Golden Gophers football seasons
Minnesota Golden Gophers football